Bitter Lake National Wildlife Refuge is a United States National Wildlife Refuge located in two separate sections in central Chaves County, New Mexico, United States, a few miles northeast of the city of Roswell. Both sections lie on the banks of the Pecos River.  The refuge was established in 1937 to provide habitat for migratory birds such as the sandhill crane and the snow goose, but it is also notable for rare native fish and the over 90 species of dragonflies and damselflies that inhabit the refuge.

Where the Chihuahuan Desert meets the Southern Plains, Bitter Lake is one of the most biologically significant wetland areas of the Pecos River basin.

Aquatic habitats
Bitter Lake includes various unique aquatic habitats. The Pecos River flows across the refuge and forms oxbow lakes. Additionally, the Roswell aquifer underlies the area. Erosion of gypsum by this underground water has caused many sinkholes, some of which have become very deep lakes that are home to unique species. Underground water also feeds springs that are the source of water for the lakes on the refuge. The water level in these lakes is managed by park personnel and is adjusted throughout the year to accommodate the different species of birds that migrate to the refuge.

Dragonflies
Bitter Lake hosts a diverse population of over 90 species of dragonflies and damselfiles. There is a special viewing area along the auto tour route, however, dragonflies can be seen throughout the refuge. The peak dragonfly population occurs in July and August. The park hosts an annual dragonfly festival in September.

Birds
Bitter Lake is especially known as a refuge for birds. There are at least 350 species of birds that have been recorded on the refuge. Bird activity varies year-round with Bitter Lake serving as a refuge for migrating species. Songbirds can be seen in the spring, especially May. In the summer months the refuge is home to many marsh and shorebirds. In the fall there are raptor migrations. Waterfowl concentrations rise in the winter. While some species such as the sandhill crane can number in the thousands, others have been spotted only on rare occasions.

Notes

External links

 Bitter Lake NWR Official Site

National Wildlife Refuges in New Mexico
Protected areas of Chaves County, New Mexico
Protected areas established in 1937
Ramsar sites in the United States
Wetlands of New Mexico
Landforms of Chaves County, New Mexico
Protected areas of the Chihuahuan Desert